Theodore Eustace (German: Theodor Eustach; 14 February 1659 – 11 July 1732) was the Count Palatine of Sulzbach from 1708 until 1732.

Life
Theodore Eustace was born in Sulzbach in 1659 as the only surviving son of Christian Augustus, Count Palatine of Sulzbach and Amalie of Nassau-Siegen. He died in Dinkelsbühl in 1732 and was buried in Sulzbach.

Marriage
Theodore Eustace married Maria Eleonore of Hesse-Rothenburg (15 September 1675 – 27 January 1720), daughter of Landgrave William (sister of Ernest Leopold), and had the following children:

Issue

Countess Palatine Amalia Auguste Maria Anna of Sulzbach (7 June 1693 – 18 January 1762) died unmarried.
Count Palatine Joseph Charles of Sulzbach (2 November 1694 – 18 July 1729) married Elisabeth Auguste of Neuburg and had issue.
Countess Palatine Francisca Christina of Sulzbach (16 May 1696 – 16 July 1776) Abbess of Essen.
Countess Palatine Ernestine Elizabeth Johanna of Sulzbach (15 May 1697 –  14 April 1775) married William II, Landgrave of Hesse-Wanfried-Rheinfels, no issue.
Count Palatine John William Philip of Sulzbach (3 June 1698 – 12 April 1699) died in infancy.
John Christian, Count Palatine of Sulzbach (23 January 1700 – 20 July 1733) married Maria Henriette de La Tour d'Auvergne and had issue; married Eleonore of Hesse-Rotenburg, no issue.
Countess Palatine Elisabeth Eleonore Auguste of Sulzbach (19 April 1702 – 10 February 1704) died in infancy.
Countess Palatine Anne Christine of Sulzbach (5 February 1704 – 12 March 1723) married Charles Emmanuel, Prince of Piedmont and had issue.
Count Palatine Johann Wilhelm August of Sulzbach (21 August 1706 – 28 August 1708) died in infancy.

Ancestry

References

1659 births
1732 deaths
House of Wittelsbach
Counts Palatine of Sulzbach
People from Sulzbach-Rosenberg
Hereditary Princes of Sulzbach
Knights of the Golden Fleece of Austria